Wojciech Stuchlik (born November 12, 1984) is a Polish tennis player and film producer.

Career

Athletics
Stuchlik started playing tennis in his native Poland from a young age, but eventually moved to the US, where he studied the sport at Queen's College. He took part in the USTA 2007 National Championships and won the Men's Doubles alongside Queens College Coach Craig Schwartz.  In April of the same year Stuchlik earned his second ECC Men's Tennis Player of the Year Award. In May, he took part in the NCAA East Regional at Kutztown University, and won alongside his double's partner, William Almeyda.

Film  
In 2009, Stuchlik was attached as a second executive producer of Polish-language film Another Man by Philip Zaluska. Later that year, Stuchlik acquired the first filming rights to the existing English-language script 'Camp Nightmare', and worked with British director Shaun Troke to turn it into the horror film Sparrow.

References

External links

Living people
1984 births
Polish male tennis players
Polish film producers
Place of birth missing (living people)